State Route 365 (SR 365) is a secondary north–south state highway located in Henderson, Chester County, Tennessee.

Route description

SR 365 begins at US 45 and SR 5.

History
Main Street at one time was part of SR 100 until the Noah Weaver Bypass was constructed which bypassed the downtown area. White Avenue was also once known as US 45 Business.

Major intersections

References

External links

365